National Highway 37 (NH 37) is a  National Highway in India. This highway starts from Badarpur near Karimganj in Assam and terminates at Imphal in Manipur.

This highway was also used for cycling event in 2016 South Asian Games.

References

External links
 NH 37 on OpenStreetMap

National highways in India